The Scriblerus Club was an informal association of authors, based in London, that came together in the early 18th century. They were prominent figures in the Augustan Age of English letters. The nucleus of the club included the satirists Jonathan Swift and Alexander Pope. Other members were John Gay, John Arbuthnot, Henry St. John and Thomas Parnell. The group was founded in 1714 and lasted until the death of the founders, finally ending in 1745. Pope and Swift are the two members whose reputations and work have the most long-lasting influence. Working collaboratively, the group created the persona of Martinus Scriblerus, through whose writings they accomplished their satirical aims. Very little of this material, however, was published until the 1740s. Robert Harley, 1st Earl of Oxford and Mortimer occasionally joined the club for meetings, though he is not known to have contributed to their literary output.  He, along with Henry St John, 1st Viscount Bolingbroke, contributed to the literary productions of the club.

The club began as an effort to satirize the abuses of learning wherever they might be found, which led to The Memoirs of Martinus Scriblerus. The second edition of Pope's The Dunciad also contains work attributed to Martinus Scriblerus.

Richard Owen Cambridge wrote a mock epic poem, the Scribleriad, where the hero is Martinus Scriblerus.

Henry Fielding's play The Welsh Opera is presented as a tribute to the "Scriblerians".  Fielding's pen name was "Scriblerus Secundus".

See also

 18th century in literature
 Augustan poetry
 1712 in poetry
 1745 in poetry
 The Scriblerian and the Kit-Cats

References

Further reading
 Lewis, Peter, and Nigel Wood. John Gay and the Scriblerians. London: Vision, 1989.
 Marshall, Ashley. The Practice of Satire in England, 1658-1770. Baltimore: Johns Hopkins University Press, 2013.

External links
 BBC audio file. In our time Radio 4 discussion programme on the Scriblerus Club. 45 minutes.
 Google Books S---t, D. Memoirs of the Life of Scriblerus. London: A. Moore, 1723.

Writing circles
English male poets

Jonathan Swift
Organizations established in the 1710s
1745 disestablishments
British parodists